The history of the Jews in Japan is well documented in modern times, with various traditions relating to much earlier eras.

Status of Jews in Japan 
Jews and their culture are by far one of the most minor ethnic and religious groups in Japan, presently consisting of only about 300 to 2,000 people or approximately 0.0016% to 0.0002% of Japan's total population. Almost all of them are not Japanese citizens and almost all of them are foreigner short-term residents.

History

Early settlements 
In 1572, Spanish Neapolitan Jews who had converted to Christianity to escape, entered Nagasaki on Black Ships from Portuguese Macau. Remaining in Nagasaki, some of them reverted to Judaism, even reclaiming their family names (notably a Levite).

In 1586, the community, then consisting of at least three permanent families, was displaced by the Shimazu forces. The Jews of Settsu absorbed some of them into its own community (at the time, a population of over 130 Jews), while a minority left or died.

Edo period 
Between 1848 and 1854, in Naha, Satsuma province, Bernard Jean Bettelheim (physician) resided with his family. He was a Christian Missionary with British citizenship, although born a Hungarian Jew.  There is a plaque at Gokokuji Jinja (Naha).

In 1861, Pogrom refugees from Russia and Poland moved to the port of Nagasaki; these were the first Jews in Nagasaki since around 1584.

In 1867, over one week the Settsu Jewish community was pushed near extinction, disappearing altogether after the Meiji restoration.

Towards the end of the Edo period, with the arrival of Commodore Matthew Perry following the Convention of Kanagawa and the end of Japan's "closed-door" foreign policy, Jewish families again began to settle in Japan. The first recorded Jewish settlers arrived at Yokohama in 1861. By 1895, this community, which by then consisted of about 50 families, established the first synagogue in Meiji Japan. Part of this community would later move to Kobe after the great Kanto earthquake of 1923.

Another early Jewish settlement was established in the 1880s in Nagasaki, a large Japanese port city opened to foreign trade by the Portuguese. This community was larger than the one in Yokohama, consisting of more than 100 families. It was here that the Beth Israel Synagogue was created in 1894. The settlement would continually grow and remain active until it eventually declined by the Russo-Japanese War in the early 20th century. The community's Torah scroll would eventually be passed down to the Jews of Kobe, a group formed of freed Russian Jewish war prisoners that had participated in the Czar's army and the Russian Revolution of 1905.

From the mid 1920s until the 1950s, the Kobe Jewish community was the largest Jewish community in Japan, formed by hundreds of Jews arriving from Russia (originating from the Manchurian city of Harbin), the Middle East (mainly from Iraq and Syria), as well as from Central and Eastern European countries (primarily Germany). It had both an Ashkenazi and a Sephardic synagogue. During this time, Tokyo's Jewish community (now Japan's largest) was slowly growing with the arrival of Jews from the United States, Western Europe and Russia.

Imperial Japan 

In 1905, at the end of the Russo-Japanese War, the community of Nagasaki went extinct. While the Iraqi community is formed in Kobe (about 40 families in 1941) Following Russia's 1917 Bolshevik Revolution, anti-Semitism exploded in Japan, with many blaming Jews as being the "nature" of the revolution.

Some Japanese leaders, such as Captain Inuzuka Koreshige (犬塚 惟重), Colonel Yasue Norihiro (安江 仙弘) and industrialist Aikawa Yoshisuke (鮎川 義介), came to believe that Jewish economic and political power could be harnessed by Japan through controlled immigration and that such a policy would also ensure favor from the United States through the influence of American Jewry. Although efforts were made to attract Jewish investment and immigrants, the plan was limited by the government's desire not to interfere with its alliance with Nazi Germany. Ultimately, it was left up to the world Jewish community to fund the settlements and to supply settlers and the plan failed to attract a significant long-term population or create the strategic benefits for Japan that had been expected by its originators. In 1937, Japan invaded China, with the Japanese ambassador to France telling the ruling Japanese that "English, American, and French Jewish plutocrats" were leading opposition to the invasion.

On December 6, 1938, Five ministers council (Prime Minister Fumimaro Konoe, Army Minister Seishirō Itagaki, Navy Minister Mitsumasa Yonai, Foreign Minister Hachirō Arita and Finance Minister Shigeaki Ikeda), which was the highest decision-making council, made a decision of prohibiting the expulsion of the Jews in Japan. With the signing of the German-Japanese Anti-COMINTERN Pact in 1936 and the Tripartite Treaty of September 1940, however, anti-Semitism gained a more formal footing in some of Tokyo's ruling circles. Meanwhile, the Japanese public was exposed to a campaign of defamation that created a popular image known as the Yudayaka, or the "Jewish peril."

During World War II, Japan was regarded by some as a safe refuge from the Holocaust, despite being a part of the Axis and an ally of Germany. Jews trying to escape German-occupied Poland could not pass the blockades near the Soviet Union and the Mediterranean Sea and were forced to go through the neutral country of Lithuania (which was occupied by belligerents in June 1940, starting with the Soviet Union, then Germany and then the Soviet Union again). Of those who arrived, many (around 5,000) were sent to the Dutch West Indies with so-called Curaçao visas issued by the Dutch consul Jan Zwartendijk , and Japanese visas issued by Chiune Sugihara, the Japanese consul to Lithuania. Zwartendijk went against Dutch consular guidelines, and Sugihara ignored his orders and gave thousands of Jews entry visas to Japan, risking his career. Together, both consuls saved more than 6,000 lives.

Sugihara is said to have cooperated with Polish intelligence, as part of a bigger Japanese-Polish cooperative plan. They managed to flee across the vast territory of Russia by train to Vladivostok and then by boat to Kobe in Japan. The refugees 2,185 in number arrived in Japan from August 1940 to June 1941. Tadeusz Romer, the Polish ambassador in Tokyo, had managed to get transit visas in Japan; asylum visas to Canada, Australia, New Zealand and Burma; immigration certificates to Palestine; and immigrant visas to the United States and some Latin American countries.

Most Jews were permitted and encouraged to move on from Japan to the Shanghai Ghetto, China, under Japanese occupation for the duration of World War II. Finally, Tadeusz Romer arrived in Shanghai on November 1, 1941, to continue the action for Jewish refugees. Among those saved in the Shanghai Ghetto were leaders and students of Mir yeshiva, the only European yeshiva to survive the Holocaust. They some 400 in number fled from Mir to Vilna with the outbreak of World War II in 1939 and then to Keidan, Lithuania. In late 1940, they obtained visas from Chiune Sugihara, to travel from Keidan (then Lithuanian SSR) via Siberia and Vladivostok to Kobe, Japan. By November 1941, the Japanese moved this group and most of others on to the Shanghai Ghetto in order to consolidate the Jews under their control.

The secretary of the Manchurian Legation in Berlin Wang Tifu (王, 替夫. 1911–) also issued visas to 12,000 refugees, including Jews, from June 1939 to May 1940.

Throughout the war, the Japanese government continually rejected some requests from the German government to establish anti-Semitic policies. However, some Jews who resided in Japanese-occupied territories were interned in detention camps in Malaysia and the Netherlands East Indies. Jews in the Philippines were also faced accusations of being involved in black market operations, price manipulation, and espionage. Towards the end, Nazi representatives pressured the Japanese army to devise a plan to exterminate Shanghai's Jewish population and this pressure eventually became known to the Jewish community's leadership. However, the Japanese had no intention of further provoking the anger of the Allies and thus delayed the German request for a time, eventually rejecting it entirely. One Orthodox Jewish institution saved in this manner was the Lithuanian Haredi Mir yeshiva. The Japanese government and people offered the Jews temporary shelter, medical services, food, transportation, and gifts, but preferred that they move on to reside in Japanese-occupied Shanghai.

The decision to declare the Shanghai Ghetto in February 1943 was influenced by the police attaché of the German embassy in Tokyo, Josef Meisinger. In autumn 1942 he had lengthy discussions with the Japanese Home Ministry. Because the Japanese were mostly not anti-Semitic, he used their espionage fear to provoke actions against the Jewish community. To the Japanese he declared, that he was ordered from Berlin to provide them all names of "anti-Nazis" among the German residents. Then he claimed that "anti-Nazis" were always "anti-Japanese" and added that "anti-Nazis" were primarily German Jews, of whom 20,000 had emigrated to Shanghai. Meisinger's anti-Semitic intrigue worked. In response to his statements, the Japanese demanded from Meisinger a list of all "anti-Nazis". This list was, as Meisinger's personal secretary later confirmed, already prepared. After consulting General Müller, Meisinger handed the list over to the Japanese Home Ministry and the Kenpeitai at the end of 1942. The list contained i. a. the names of all Jews with a German passport in Japan. Karl Hamel, the interpreter of Meisinger, who was present at the discussions with the Japanese authorities, later testified that this intervention led to a "real chasing of anti-Nazis" and to the "internment of quite a lot of people". He added that "this thesis may be regarded as the basic explanation of Mr. Meisinger’s activities in Japan with regard to the splitting up of the German Community into Nazis and anti-Nazis." This testimony of Karl Hamel to Allied interrogation specialists was kept strictly confidential for a long time. During lawsuits for compensation of inmates of the Shanghai Ghetto in the 1950s, former German diplomats were able to convince the judges, that the proclamation of the ghetto was a sovereign act of the Japanese and not related to German authorities.

At war's end, about half of the Jews who had been in Japanese-controlled territories later moved on to the Western hemisphere (such as the United States and Canada) and the remainder moved to other parts of the world, mainly to Israel.

Since the 1920s, there have been occasional events and statements reflecting antisemitism in Japan, generally promoted by fringe elements and tabloid newspapers.

Postwar Japan 

After World War II, a large portion of the few Jews that were in Japan left, many going to what would become Israel. Some of those who remained married locals and were assimilated into Japanese society.

Presently, there are several hundred Jewish families living in Tokyo, and a small number of Jewish families in and around Kobe. A small number of Jewish expatriates of other countries live throughout Japan, temporarily, for business, research, a gap year, or a variety of other purposes. 

There are always Jewish members of the United States Armed Forces serving on Okinawa and in the other American military bases throughout Japan. Camp Foster in Okinawa has a dedicated Jewish Chapel where the Jewish Community of Okinawa has been worshipping since the 1980s. Okinawa has had a continuous presence of Rabbis, serving as military Chaplains, for the past 4 decades. 

There are community centers serving Jewish communities in Tokyo and Kobe. The Chabad-Lubavitch organization has two official centers in Tokyo and in Kobe and there is an additional Chabad house run by Rabbi Yehezkel Binyomin Edery.

In the cultural domain, each year, hundreds, if not thousands, of Jews visit the Chiune Sugihara Memorial Museum located in Yaotsu, Gifu Prefecture, in central Japan. Chiune Sugihara's grave in Kamakura is the place where Jewish visitors pay their respect. Sugihara's actions of issuing valid transit visas are thought to have saved the lives of around 6,000 Jews, who fled across Russia to Vladivostok and then Japan to escape the concentration camps. In the same prefecture, many Jews also visit Takayama city.

Rabbis

Tokyo Jewish Community 
 Rabbi Herman Dicker, 1960–1963, Orthodox
 Rabbi Marvin Tokayer, 1968–1976, Orthodox
 Rabbi Jonathan Z. Maltzman, 1980–1983, Conservative
 Rabbi Michael Schudrich, 1983–Present Conservative
 Rabbi Moshe Silberschein, 1989–1992, Conservative
 Rabbi Jim Lebeau, 1993–1997, Conservative
 Rabbi Carnie Shalom Rose, 1998–1999, Conservative
 Rabbi Elliot Marmon, 1999–2002, Conservative
 Rabbi Henri Noach, 2002–2008, Conservative
 Rabbi Rachel Smookler, Reform, interim-rabbi
 Rabbi Antonio Di Gesù, 2009–2013, Conservative
 Rabbi David Kunin, 2013-2022, Conservative
 Rabbi Andrew Scheer, 2022-Present, Orthodox

Chabad 
 Rabbi Mendi Sudakevich
 Rabbi Yehezkel Binyomin Edery

Jewish Community of Kobe 
 Rabbi Gaoni Maatuf, 1998–2002
 Rabbi Asaf Tobi, 2002–2006
 Rabbi Yerachmiel Strausberg, 2006–2008
 Hagay Blumenthal, 2008–2009, lay leader
 Daniel Moskovich, 2009–2010, lay leader
 Rabbi David Gingold, 2010–2013
 Rabbi Shmuel Vishedsky, 2014–present

Jewish Community of Okinawa 
 Rabbi Yonatan Warren, 2011-2014
 Rabbi Yonina Creditor , 2013-2016
 Rabbi David Bauman, 2016-2017 
 Rabbi Yonatan Greenberg, 2018-present 
 Rabbi Levy Pekar, 2019-present

List of notable Jews in Japan 

 Abraham Kaufman
 Alan Kawarai Lefor, MD MPH PhD FACS, Professor of Surgery
 Alan Merrill
 Albert Mosse
 Alfred Birnbaum
 Arie Selinger
 Ayako Fujitani, writer and actress
 Avi Schafer
 Barak Kushner
 Beate Sirota Gordon, former Performing Arts Director of Japan Society and Asia Society
 Ben-Ami Shillony, Israeli Japanologist
 Chaim Janowski
 Charles Louis Kades
 Dan Calichman
 David G. Goodman, Japanologist
 Emil Orlík
 Emmanuel Metter
 Fumiko Kometani, author and artist
 Heinrich Bürger
 Henryk Lipszyc
 Hoshitango Imachi, né Imachi Marcelo Salomon
 Jack Halpern, Israeli linguist, Kanji-scholar
 Jay Rubin
 John Nathan
 Joseph Rosenstock, conductor of the NHK Symphony Orchestra
 Julie Dreyfus
 Karl Taro Greenfeld, journalist and author
 Klaus Pringsheim Sr.
 Kurt Singer
 Leonid Kreutzer, pianist
 Leo Sirota
 Ludwig Riess
 Manfred Gurlitt
 Martin "Marty" Adam Friedman, rock guitarist
 Max Janowski
 Michael Kogan, founder of Taito
 Ofer Feldman, University professor
 Peter Berton, Japanologist
 Péter Frankl, Hungarian mathematician
 Rachel Elior
 Raphael Schoyer
 Rena "Rusty" Kanokogi, née Glickman
 Roger Pulvers
 Setsuzo (Avraham) Kotsuji, Hebrew professor
 Shaul Eisenberg, businessman
 Shifra Horn
 Suiren Higashino, female photographer, model 
 Sulamith Messerer
 Szymon Goldberg
 Yaacov Liberman
 Yakov Zinberg, Prof., Kokushikan University
 Zerach Warhaftig
 
  
 , Israeli Esperantist
 Hideo Levy
 Peter Barakan
 Steven Seagal

People of Jewish descent 
 Bernard Jean Bettelheim (Christian)
 Luís de Almeida (New Christian)
 Martin Kafka

Refugees, short expatriates 
 Adolf (Aron) Moses Pollak (Ritter) von Rudin
 Albert Kahn (banker)
 Emil Lederer
 Franz Oppenheimer
 George W. F. Hallgarten
 Hayyim Selig Slonimski
 Karl Kindermann, interpreter and informant for the Gestapo
 Karl Löwith
 Leo Melamed
 Mirra Alfassa
 Moshe Atzmon
 Norman Mailer
 Robert Alan Feldman
 Samuel Isaac Joseph Schereschewsky (Christian)

Other related people to Judaism and Jews in Japan 
 Hana Brady, and George Brady
 Jeremy Glick
 Lili Kraus
 Samuel Ullman

Ambassadors 
 Eli Cohen
  Ruth Kahanoff (Kahanov)

Films 
 Jewish Soul Music: The Art of Giora Feidman (1980). Directed by Uri Barbash.

See also 

 Religion in Japan
 Shingō, Aomori- Japanese village where Jesus Christ is claimed to have fled
 Antisemitism in Japan
 Israel–Japan relations (since 1952)
 Ethnic issues in Japan
 Jewish settlement in the Japanese Empire
 Fugu Plan (1934, 1938)
 Racial Equality Proposal (1919)
 Japanese-Jewish common ancestry theory
 Timeline of Jewish history

References

External links 
 The Jews of Kobe
 Jews in the Japanese Mind by David G. Goodman and Miyazawa Masanori.
 Our history - The Jewish Community of Japan

 
 
Jews and Judaism in Japan
Judaism